Bours may refer to:
 Bours, Pas-de-Calais, a commune in France
 Bours, Hautes-Pyrénées, a commune in France
 Robinson Bours family, a Mexican family of Anglo-American/Anglo-French origin.

sr:Бур